(Italian for The Golden Cross) is an opera in 3 acts by Henrique Oswald to an Italian libretto. It was composed in 1872. No performances of it are registered. The work remains unpublished.

History 
The Golden Cross was the first opera composed by young Oswald. The librettist is not identified. The manuscript score consists of 237 pages.

In this work the composer prefers great sonorous masses and a dense orchestral texture. Concerning the voices and their relation with orchestra, it seems that he inclined to the dramatic school of voicing.

Scoring 
There are six main characters (2 sopranos, mezzo-soprano, tenor, bariton, bass) and a mixed chorus (SATB).

The orchestra consists of piccolo, flutes, oboes, clarinets (in B), bassoons; trumpets (in F), trombone (in F), bass trombone (ophicleide); harp; timpani, gran cassa, piatti; strings.

Structure 
The opera is divided in Italian manner into separate musical numbers: recitativos, arias, duets, quartets, choruses and intermezzi.

References 

Operas by Henrique Oswald
Italian-language operas
1872 operas
Operas